Puperita bensoni is a species of sea snail, a marine gastropod mollusk in the family Neritidae.

Description

Distribution
This species occurs in the Indian Ocean off the Mascarene Basin.

References

 Drivas, J. & M. Jay (1988). Coquillages de La Réunion et de l'île Maurice
 Steyn, D.G. & Lussi, M. (1998) Marine Shells of South Africa. An Illustrated Collector’s Guide to Beached Shells. Ekogilde Publishers, Hartebeespoort, South Africa, ii + 264 pp. page(s): 30

Neritidae
Gastropods described in 1850